Uzbekistan National News Agency also known as UzA is a government run news agency in Uzbek, Russian, English and French languages. The headquarters of the agency is in  Tashkent.

References

External links 
Uzbekistan National News AgencyOffical Site
BBC Uzbekistan media

Mass media in Tashkent
Year of establishment missing
News agencies based in Uzbekistan